The 1971 Oklahoma Sooners football team represented the University of Oklahoma in the 1971 NCAA University Division football season. Oklahoma was a member of the Big Eight Conference and played its home games in Oklahoma Memorial Stadium where it has played its home games since 1923.  The team posted an 11–1 and 6–1 conference record under head coach Chuck Fairbanks. The Sooners finished the season ranked #2, losing only once, 35–31 to eventual national champion Nebraska in the 1971 Nebraska vs. Oklahoma football game, which has become known as Game of the Century.

In 1971, offensive coordinator Barry Switzer perfected the wishbone offense as it led the nation in both scoring (45 points average) and total yards (563 total yards average), and set an NCAA record by averaging over 472.4 (5196 in 11 games) rushing yards in a season. The team holds the current school record with 7.07 yards per rushing attempt and 7.6 yards per play as well as the records for 469.6 rushing yards (5635 in 12 games counting bowl game) and 566.83 yards of total offense per game.  The team also holds the single-season rushing touchdowns record of 62 and rushing touchdowns per game record of 5.17.  The team's records of 711 single-game rushing yards and 785 total yards stood for nine seasons. Jack Mildren's single-season record for yards rushing by a quarterback of 1140 would be broken three seasons later by Freddie Solomon.

Greg Pruitt set the current national single-season record with 8.98 yards per attempt, the school's single-game records of 294 rushing yards and 374 all-purpose yards.  Meanwhile, Jon Harrison set the single-season and career yards per reception with 29.1 and 27.0. His 2066 single-season all-purpose yards record stood until Quentin Griffin broke it in 2002. Joe Wylie's kickoff return average record of 28.5 stood for 27 years.

The team was led by three All-Americans: Pruitt, Tom Brahaney and Jack Mildren.   The team won its first nine games on a schedule that included five ranked opponents (In order, #17 USC, #3 Texas, #6 Colorado, #1 Nebraska and #5 Auburn).  All five of these opponents finished the season ranked.  The only loss was to Nebraska. They played Auburn in the Sugar Bowl and won 40–22.

The top three teams in the final AP poll for the 1971 season were from the Big Eight: Nebraska, Oklahoma, and Colorado. The top two teams had never been from the same conference, and this year had three.

Pruitt led the team in rushing with 1760 yards, Mildren led the team in passing yards for the third straight season with 889 yards and also in scoring with 12 points, Harrison led the team in receiving with 494 yards, Mark Driscoll led the team in tackles with 134, and John Shelly led the team in interceptions with 5.

Roster

Schedule

Game summaries

SMU

Pittsburgh

USC

Texas

Colorado

Kansas State

Iowa State

Missouri

Kansas

Nebraska

Oklahoma and Nebraska battled back and forth in the Game of the Century in front of a sold-out crowd in Norman and over 55 million viewers on ABC-TV on Thanksgiving Day.  Nebraska struck first with a 72-yard Johnny Rodgers punt return, but Oklahoma pulled ahead by 3 by halftime.  The Cornhuskers came back strong in the third quarter with two more touchdowns, but the Sooners responded with two of their own to retake the lead with only 7:10 remaining.  Down by 3 points, the Huskers went on a final drive and with only 1:38 remaining, Jeff Kinney scored his fourth touchdown of the day for the lead and the win.

Oklahoma State

Sugar Bowl

Passing: AUB Sullivan 20/44, 250 Yds, TD, INT, OU Mildren 1/4, 11 Yds
Rushing: AUB Unger 6 Rush, 38 Yds, 2 TD, OU Mildren 30 Rush, 149 Yds, 3 TD
Receiving: AUB Beasley 6 Rec, 117 Yds, OU Chandler 1 Rec, 11 Yds
OU Crosswhite 4 yd run (kick failed)
OU Mildren 5 yd run (Carroll kick)
OU Mildren 4 yd run (kick failed)
OU Mildren 7 yd run (kick failed)
OU Wylie 71 yd punt return (kick failed)
AUB Unger 1 yd run (Jett kick)
OU Caroll 53 yd FG
AUB Unger 1 yd run (Jett kick)
OU Pruitt 2 yd run (kick failed)
AUB Cannon 11 yd pass from Sullivan (run good)

Rankings

Awards and honors
All-American: Greg Pruitt, Tom Brahaney and Jack Mildren
Academic All-American: Mildren

Postseason

NFL draft
The following players were drafted into the National Football League following the season.

References

External links
 Sports Reference – 1971 Oklahoma football season

Oklahoma
Oklahoma Sooners football seasons
Sugar Bowl champion seasons
Oklahoma Sooners football